Out of Control: Live from the O2 2009 is a live album by British pop group Girls Aloud. The CD is part of the Out Of Control Live from The O2 2009 DVD limited fan edition set, only available on Girls Aloud's official website. The CD was recorded on 24 May 2009 at The O2 Arena in  London while the group was on their Out of Control Tour. The album contains all the songs from the tour, with the exception of the Megamix that ends the show.

Track listing

2009 live albums
2009 video albums
Girls Aloud albums
Live video albums